Ynysybwl is a village in Cwm Clydach in Wales.

Cwm Clydach is flanked by the Rhondda and Cynon Valleys. The market town of Pontypridd lies to the south at the meeting point of the three valleys; and to the north lies the large Llanwynno forestry. Before the local government reforms of 1996 Ynysybwl was in the Cynon Valley district of Morgannwg Ganol, and the area is historically a part of Glamorgan (Morgannwg).

Name
There is uncertainty over the meaning of the name of the village.

Ynys means 'island' or 'river meadow' in Welsh and probably refers to such a meadow on the banks of the Clydach stream. The 'bŵl' element is more difficult.  Some theories include 'bowl/ball' [see 'bŵl' GPC] possibly a reference to the shape of the river-meadow or to a handball game played locally).

Locally, the village is often referred to as just "Bwl" or "The Bwl".

Early history
Ynysybwl is located in the centre of the Llanwynno parish, at the point where the stream known as Y Ffrwd flows into the Nant Clydach. Then a collection of small local farms and meadows in a quiet and completely rural valley, at the 1841 census around 200 people lived in the village and surrounding farms.

Religion

Governance
Ynysybwl was the name of an electoral ward, created in 1898 for elections to Mountain Ash Urban District Council.

Since 1995 Ynysybwl has been an electoral ward to Rhondda Cynon Taf County Borough Council, electing one county borough councillor. Following a local government boundary review, the number of councillors was increased to two, effective from the 2022 Rhondda Cynon Taf County Borough Council election.

At the lowest tier of local government, Ynysybwl is represented by Ynysybwl & Coed-y-Cwm Community Council.

Coal Industry
The rich seams of coal in the Mynachdy level that lie beneath the surface had thus far only been tapped to the amount required to supply these local farms. David Davies began test bores in the early 1880s at Graigddu ("Black Rock"), which proved positive, and the resultant sinking of Lady Windsor Colliery by the Ocean Coal Company on 16 June 1884 gave birth to new coal town.

Lady Windsor Colliery

Lady Windsor Colliery opened in 1886, with 300 new miners' houses built on the opposite (western) side of the valley in typical terraced fashion by the mining company to house its workers and their families.

At its peak, the colliery employed around 1,500 people directly, although most of the 6,000-7,000 village community relied upon the pit in one way or another. The pit thrived throughout the first half of the 20th century, one of a number of very successful mines in South Wales.

However coal mining fell out of favour with many people, including politicians, and the Lady Windsor Colliery did not escape the troubles that plagued the industry during the miners' strikes of the early 1980s. The pit was finally closed in 1988.

Present day

Despite the pit closure, the village has survived, people finding work in the newly developing industries in nearby Pontypridd, Treforest, Aberdare, Caerphilly, Merthyr Tydfil and Cardiff.

This, coupled with the replacement of the pit as the village focus by local churches, Nonconformist chapels, clubs and associations, has led to a renewed interest in regeneration of the village. This led to the formation of the Ynysybwl Regeneration Partnership, an umbrella group formed to help achieve funding and organisation for activities within the village.

Today, Ynysybwl has many clubs and associations for such a small village, boasting karate, rugby, football, netball, bowls, cricket, a pony club, a brass band (Lady Windsor Colliery Band) and sections of the Brownies. The village no longer has a male voice choir.

The nearby Llanwynno forestry also has the successful Daerwynno Outdoor Activity Centre, an outdoor pursuits centre run by people from the village, and a newly developing cycle path that will form part of the local Taff Trail.

Places and events
As with many Industrial Revolution-born villages, Ynysybwl is a community based around a number of key places.

The local Trerobart and Glanffrwd schools cater for over 450 pupils. The Recreation Ground is the home to many of the village's sporting clubs, hosting rugby, football, cricket and bowls as well as incorporating a large playing area. Drinking establishments include the Roberttown, Constitutional Club and the Old Ynys-y-Bwl Inn.

The largest regular event around Ynysybwl is the regular passage of the Network Q Rally of Great Britain through the Llanwynno forestry.

A further traditional event is the running of the Nos Galan Races, in tribute to the legend of Guto Nyth Brân.

Also, Ynysybwl has a Co-op and a corner shop on its high street.

Overlooking the village from the mountainside is a prominent rock formation known locally as Rock Ar Valla (.) The origin of this name is unknown however, due to language and mispronunciation, is also known as Rock Of Allah and Rock Ar Allan (.)

Transport
The Ynysybwl branch line railway was opened in 1885 to serve mineral workings in the valley. A passenger service was started in 1890, at first to Abercynon but later more conveniently to Pontypridd.

Lady Windsor Colliery was a dominant source of business for the line. After World War II passenger carrying declined greatly, and the passenger service was withdrawn in 1953.The line closed completely in 1988 when Lady Windsor Colliery closed.

Notable people
See also :Category:People from Ynysybwl

 Alun Wyn Davies - rugby, Welsh team coach
 Don Dearson -  Footballer, Welsh international
 Garin Jenkins - Wales' most-capped hooker
 Staff Jones - rugby, capped for Wales in 1983 and toured with the British Lions to New Zealand in 1985
 Ken Leek - footballer, Welsh International, played for Northampton, Leicester, Newcastle, Birmingham, Northampton, Bradford City, Rhyl, Merthyr, Ton Pentre.
 Dale McIntosh - rugby, Pontypridd RFC captain
 Leighton Rees - darts player, first ever World Champion in 1978
 Tommy Scourfield - rugby union player capped for Wales in 1930
 Gareth Dean - Rugby League player, Welsh International, played for Wigan Warriors, London Broncos, Celtic Crusaders, Cardiff Demons, Workington, Carcassonne.
 Adam Thomas - Rugby Union player, Wales 7's International, played for Cardiff Blues, Pontypridd, Ynysybwl.

References

External links
 Ynysybwl Rugby Club
 Ynysybwl.com
 www.geograph.co.uk : photos of Ynysybwl and surrounding area
  : Ynysybwl & Coed-y-Cwm Community Council
 The Old Bwl Inn

Location grid

Villages in Rhondda Cynon Taf